Admiral Sir John Cunningham Kirkwood "Jock" Slater,  (born 27 March 1938) is a retired Royal Navy officer. He commanded a minesweeper, a frigate and then a destroyer before taking over the aircraft carrier  and then achieving higher command in the Navy. He served as First Sea Lord and Chief of the Naval Staff from 1995 to 1998: in that capacity he played a key role in the 1998 Strategic Defence Review carried out by the Labour Government that had come to power a year earlier.

Early life
Slater was the son of James Kirkwood Slater and Margaret Claire Byrom Bramwell, daughter of Dr Edwin Bramwell.

Slater was educated in his early years at the Edinburgh Academy before attending Sedbergh School and the Royal Naval College, Dartmouth. Slater is a great nephew of Admiral of the Fleet The Viscount Cunningham of Hyndhope who served as First Sea Lord during the Second World War.

Naval career
Slater joined the Royal Navy as a cadet in 1956 and was confirmed in the rank of sub lieutenant on 1 January 1959. During his early career he served in the destroyer , the minesweeper , the Royal Yacht HMY Britannia and the destroyer . In 1965 he was given command of the minesweeper HMS Soberton, which he commanded on fishery protection duties, before specialising in navigation. He was posted to the shore establishment  later that year and then served in the aircraft carrier  and then the frigate  over the next two years.

Slater became an Equerry to the Queen on 12 October 1968 and, having been promoted to lieutenant commander on 22 October 1968, his services were recognised when he was made a Lieutenant of the Royal Victorian Order on 15 October 1971. Following promotion to commander on 31 December 1971, he was given command of the frigate  in 1972. He was posted to the Directorate of Naval Operations at the Ministry of Defence in 1973 and, following promotion to captain on 30 June 1976, he was given command of the destroyer  in August of that year. He attended the Royal College of Defence Studies in 1978 and then became assistant director of Naval Warfare at the Ministry of Defence in 1979. He went on to become the first commanding officer of the aircraft carrier  in May 1981 and then became Captain at the School of Maritime Operations and Commander of HMS Dryad in July 1983. 

Slater was promoted to rear admiral on 18 June 1985, on appointment as Assistant Chief of the Defence Staff (Policy and Nuclear), and then promoted to vice admiral on 20 October 1987, on appointment as Flag Officer Scotland and Northern Ireland as well as NATO Commander Northern Sub-Area Eastern Atlantic, NATO Commander Nore Sub-Area Channel and Commander HM Naval Base Rosyth. Appointed a Knight Commander of the Order of the Bath in the 1988 Birthday Honours, he went on to be Chief of Fleet Support in March 1989. He was promoted to full admiral on appointment as Commander-in-Chief Fleet as well as NATO Commander-in-Chief, Channel and Commander-in-Chief, Eastern Atlantic in January 1991. Advanced to Knight Grand Cross of the Order of the Bath in the 1992 Birthday Honours, he became Vice-Chief of the Defence Staff in January 1993.

Slater was appointed First Sea Lord and Chief of the Naval Staff in July 1995. In that capacity he played a key role in the Strategic Defence Review carried out by the incoming Labour Government. He retired in December 1998.

Later career
In retirement Slater has served as a Non-Executive Director of VT Group and of Lockheed Martin UK. He has also been Chairman of the executive committee of the Royal National Lifeboat Institution, Chairman of the Royal Navy Club of 1765 & 1785, Chairman of the Trustees of the Imperial War Museum and Chairman of the Council of Management of the White Ensign Association. He has been a Deputy Lieutenant of Hampshire, an Elder Brother of Trinity House, a Prime Warden of the Shipwrights' Company, and a Freeman of the City of London. His other interests mostly include outdoor activities.

Family
In 1972 Slater married Ann Frances, daughter of William Scott OBE DL, by whom he has two sons (Charles and Rory).

References

External links
 Debrett's People of Today

|-

|-

|-

|-

1938 births
Deputy Lieutenants of Hampshire
Equerries
First Sea Lords and Chiefs of the Naval Staff
Foreign recipients of the Legion of Merit
Graduates of Britannia Royal Naval College
Knights Grand Cross of the Order of the Bath
Lieutenants of the Royal Victorian Order
Living people
People educated at Edinburgh Academy
People educated at Sedbergh School
Place of birth missing (living people)
Royal Navy admirals
Royal Navy personnel of the Falklands War
Graduates of the Royal College of Defence Studies
Members of Trinity House